Calosima munroei is a moth in the family Blastobasidae. It is found in the Marin and Contra Costa counties of coastal California.

The length of the forewings is 7.4–9 mm. The ground color of the area of the cell mostly has pale brownish-gray scales intermixed with few pale brownish-gray scales tipped with brown. The scales outside of the area near the cell are mostly with brown scales tipped with pale grayish brown, intermixed with few pale grayish-brown scales. The hindwings are pale grayish brown.

Larvae have been reared from cones of Cupressus goveniana, Cupressus sargenti and also from dead willow.

Etymology
The species is named in honor of Eugene Munroe.

References

Moths described in 2003
munroei
Fauna of the San Francisco Bay Area